Vrishakapi (Sanskrit: वृषाकपिः, IAST: Vṛṣākapi)
 is a name found in vedic texts which in later texts is known as an alternative name of either Vishnu, Rudra or Surya.

References

External links 

 Story of Vrishakapi

Creator gods
Destroyer gods
Hindu eschatology
Hindu gods